The 1932 Bowling Green Falcons football team was an American football team that represented Bowling Green State College (later renamed Bowling Green State University) as an independent during the 1932 college football season. In its ninth season under head coach Warren Steller, the team compiled a 3–3–1 record and was outscored by a total of 77 to 33. Willard Schaller was the team captain.

Schedule

References

Bowling Green
Bowling Green Falcons football seasons
Bowling Green Falcons football